De Aar Solar Power is located 6 km outside the town of De Aar in the Northern Cape Province of South Africa. The facility is based on over 100 hectares of Emathanjeni Municipal land, and comprises 167,580 solar (PV) panels. De Aar Solar Power supplies Eskom with 85,458 MWh of renewable electrical energy per year; enough to power more than 19 000 average South African households.

De Aar Solar Power signed a 20-year Power Purchase Agreement with Eskom as part of the South African Government’s Renewable Energy Independent Power Producer Procurement Programme (REIPPP) and was one of the first solar power projects in South Africa. The project also has an Implementation Agreement with the South African Department of Energy.

The project received full Environmental Authorisation from the Department of Environmental Affairs in 2011.

Background 

Mainstream Renewable Energy was responsible for the construction management of the De Aar solar facility, which took place between December 2012 and mid-2014.

De Aar Solar Power is owned by a consortium comprising: Globeleq, Thebe Investment Corporation, Mainstream Renewable Power, The Sibona Ilanga Trust, Enzani Technologies and Usizo Engineering. Globeleq and Siemens Energy Sector jointly manage the project.

Solar panels 

The 167 580 Suntech STP 290/295 Watt solar panels at De Aar Solar Power each with a capacity of 290 and 295 Watt and measure 1 x 2m. The inverters used at this facility are SINVERT PVS2400.

Local community 

Benefits for the local community arising from the construction and operation of De Aar Solar include a number of enterprise development and socio-economic development programmes, as well as local procurement and employment opportunities.

Some of the projects supported include: Foundation for Alcohol Related Research, Early Childhood Development, Reading Coach Programme, Telematics Programme, Gentle Care Centre, and an Engineering Scholarship Fund

See also 

 List of power stations in South Africa
 Solar power
 Environmental impact of solar power
 Sustainable energy

References

Photovoltaic power stations in South Africa
Proposed renewable energy power stations in South Africa
Economy of the Northern Cape